Ras Osta (also spelled Ras Usta) is a municipality in the Byblos District of  Keserwan-Jbeil Governorate, Lebanon. It is 55 kilometers north of Beirut. Ras Osta has an average elevation of 900 meters above sea level and a total land area of 429 hectares. There were two companies with more than five employees operating in the village as of 2008. Its inhabitants are predominantly Shia Muslims.

References

Populated places in Byblos District
Shia Muslim communities in Lebanon